This is a list of NCAA Division II men's basketball tournament bids by school, at the conclusion of the 2022 tournament.  As of 2022, there are a total of 64 bids possible (23 automatic qualifiers, 41 at-large).

Division II members 
 Teams in bold are still alive in the 2023 NCAA Division II men's basketball tournament.
 Appearances include those made by schools in the NCAA College Division Men's Basketball Tournament, the direct predecessor to the current Division II and Division III tournaments. The NCAA did not adopt its current three-division alignment until the 1973–74 school year, when the College Division was split into Divisions II and III.
 School names reflect those in current use by their respective athletic programs, not necessarily those used when a school made an appearance in the Division II tournament. For example, Jefferson was known as Philadelphia College of Textiles & Science (athletically "Philadelphia Textile") when it won its NCAA title in 1970, Utah Tech was known as Dixie State during its Division II tenure, and Omaha used its institutional identity of Nebraska–Omaha when it made all of its D-II tournament appearances. 
 Vacated appearances are not included in the standings.

Notes

Teams with no appearances 
The following active Division II teams are still awaiting their first tournament bids, as of 2022. Conference affiliations are current for the 2022–23 season.
California Collegiate Athletic Association (1) – Cal State Monterey Bay
Central Atlantic Collegiate Conference (5) – Chestnut Hill, Georgian Court, Goldey–Beacom, Post (CT), Wilmington (DE)
Central Intercollegiate Athletic Association (1) – Lincoln (PA)
Conference Carolinas (4) – Chowan, Converse, Erskine, Lees–McRae
East Coast Conference (4) – D'Youville, Mercy, Roberts Wesleyan, Staten Island
 D'Youville is not eligible for the NCAA tournament until 2023–24.
Great American Conference (1) – Northwestern Oklahoma State
Great Lakes Intercollegiate Athletic Conference (1) – Purdue Northwest
 Roosevelt is scheduled to join in 2023–24 but will not be eligible for the NCAA tournament until 2026–27.
Great Lakes Valley Conference (3) – Maryville (MO), UIS, William Jewell
Great Midwest Athletic Conference (4) – Lake Erie, Thomas More, Tiffin, Trevecca Nazarene
 Thomas More is not eligible for the NCAA tournament until 2025–26.
Great Northwest Athletic Conference (1) – Simon Fraser
Gulf South Conference (2) – Auburn Montgomery, Shorter
Lone Star Conference (3) – Oklahoma Christian, UT Tyler, Western New Mexico
 Sul Ross State plans to join in 2024–25 but will not be eligible for the NCAA tournament until 2026–27.
Mountain East Conference (2) – Davis & Elkins, Frostburg State
Northern Sun Intercollegiate Conference (4) – Concordia–St. Paul, Minnesota–Crookston, Minot State, Sioux Falls
Pacific West Conference (3) – Dominican (CA), Holy Names, Westmont
  Westmont is not eligible for the NCAA tournament until 2025–26. Jessup and Menlo are scheduled to join in 2023–24 but will not be eligible until 2026–27.
Peach Belt Conference (2) – USC Beaufort, Young Harris
 USC Beaufort is not eligible for the NCAA tournament until 2025–26, as its first men's basketball season begins no later than 2023–24.
Pennsylvania State Athletic Conference (2) – Seton Hill, Shepherd
Rocky Mountain Athletic Conference (3) – Chadron State, South Dakota Mines, Westminster (UT)
South Atlantic Conference (5) – Coker,  Emory & Henry, Mars Hill, Newberry, UVA Wise
Emory & Henry is not eligible for the NCAA tournament until 2024–25.
Southern Intercollegiate Athletic Conference (3) – Allen, Edward Waters, Spring Hill
Allen and Edward Waters are not eligible for the NCAA tournament until 2024–25.

Former Division II members

Notes

See also 
NCAA Division I men's basketball tournament
NCAA Division III men's basketball tournament
NAIA Men's Basketball Championships
NAIA Women's Basketball Championships
NCAA Division I men's basketball tournament bids by school
List of NCAA Division III men's basketball tournament bids by school

References 

Bids by school
NCAA lists
College basketball in the United States lists